In two spatial and one time dimensions, general relativity turns out to have no propagating gravitational degrees of freedom. In fact, it can be shown that in a vacuum, spacetime will always be locally flat (or de Sitter or anti-de Sitter depending upon the cosmological constant). This makes (2+1)-dimensional topological gravity (2+1D topological gravity) a topological theory with no gravitational local degrees of freedom.

Physicists became interested in the relation between Chern–Simons theory and gravity during the 1980s. 
This theory can be exactly solved, making it a toy model for quantum gravity. The Killing form involves the Hodge dual.

Witten later changed his mind, and argued that nonperturbatively 2+1D topological gravity differs from Chern–Simons because the functional measure is only over nonsingular vielbeins. He suggested the CFT dual is a monster conformal field theory, and computed the entropy of BTZ black holes.

References 

Quantum gravity